Giovanni Bianchini (in Latin, Johannes Blanchinus) (1410 – c. 1469) was a professor of mathematics and astronomy at the University of Ferrara and court astrologer of Leonello d'Este. He was an associate of Georg Purbach and Regiomontanus. The letters exchanged with Regiomontanus in 1463–1464 mention works by Bianchini entitled: Primum mobile (astronomical tables included), Flores almagesti, Compositio instrumenti.

Bianchini was the first mathematician in Europe to use decimal positional fractions for his trigonometric tables, at the same time as Al-Kashi in Samarkand. In De arithmetica, part of the Flores almagesti, he uses operations with negative numbers and expresses the Law of Signs.

He was probably the father of the instrument maker Antonio Bianchino.

The crater Blanchinus on the Moon is named after him.

Works 

 
 Silvio Magrini (ed.), Joannes de Blanchinis ferrariensis e il suo carteggio scientifico col Regiomontano (1463-64), Zuffi, 1916 — Scientific letters exchanged by Bianchini and Regiomontanus

See also 
Giovanni Bianchini should not be confused with two similarly-named Italians with their own lunar craters: Francesco Bianchini (1662–1729) (and the Bianchini crater), and Giuseppe Biancani (1566–1624) (and the Blancanus crater).

External links 

 Vescovini, Graziella Federici. « Bianchini, Giovanni ». In: Dizionario Biografico degli Italiani
 Institute and History of the Museum of Science
 Antonio Bianchini

15th-century Italian astronomers
15th-century Italian mathematicians
1410 births
1460s deaths